Proclus (or Proklos) Mallotes was a Stoic philosopher and a native of Mallus in Cilicia. According to the Suda he was the author of the following books:

 Commentary on the Sophisms of Diogenes
 A treatise against Epicurus

His date is unknown; he probably lived at some point between the 1st century BC and the 3rd century AD. It is probably this Proclus who is mentioned by Proclus Diadochus.

Notes

1st-century BC philosophers
1st-century philosophers
2nd-century philosophers
3rd-century philosophers
Hellenistic-era philosophers from Anatolia
People from Karataş
Stoic philosophers